Heneicosylic acid, or heneicosanoic acid, is the organic compound with the formula .  It is the straight-chain 21-carbon saturated fatty acid. It is a colorless solid.

It has shown relevance in the production of foams, paints, and related viscous materials. 
A laboratory preparation involves permanganate oxidation of 1-docosene.

See also
List of saturated fatty acids
Very long chain fatty acids
List of carboxylic acids

References

Fatty acids
Alkanoic acids